The third season of Supernatural, an American dark fantasy television series created by Eric Kripke, premiered on October 4, 2007, and concluded on May 15, 2008. Traveling throughout America, protagonists Sam (Jared Padalecki) and Dean Winchester (Jensen Ackles) use their father's journal to help them carry on the family business—saving people and hunting supernatural creatures. The season begins with the brothers tracking down the demons released from Hell in the previous season finale. They become allies with a demon named Ruby (Katie Cassidy), who claims to know a way to release Dean from his demonic pact—he had sold his soul to a demon and was given a year to live in exchange for Sam's resurrection—and wants to protect them from the new demonic leader Lilith. As Dean's deadline approaches, their efforts are further hindered by Bela Talbot (Lauren Cohan), a professional thief of occult items who is often at odds with the Winchesters.

In the United States the season aired on Thursdays at 9:00 pm ET on The CW television network. The CW ordered 22 episodes for the season, but interference from the 2007–08 Writers Guild of America strike ultimately limited the season to 16 episodes. Some storylines were thus postponed, which Kripke felt ultimately benefited the season by forcing the writers to focus on saving Dean. Despite its low ratings—it averaged only about 2.74 million American viewers—the series received an early renewal for a fourth season.

Warner Home Video released the season on DVD as a five-disc box set in Region 1 on September 2, 2008, in Region 2 on August 25, 2008, and in Region 4 on September 30, 2008. The episodes are also available through digital retailers such as Apple's iTunes Store, Microsoft's Xbox Live Marketplace, and Amazon.com's on-demand TV service.

Cast

Starring
 Jared Padalecki as Sam Winchester
 Jensen Ackles as Dean Winchester
 Katie Cassidy as Ruby / Lilith
 Lauren Cohan as Bela Talbot

Guest stars

Episodes

In this table, the number in the first column refers to the episode's number within the entire series, whereas the number in the second column indicates the episode's number within that particular season. "U.S. viewers in millions" refers to how many Americans watched the episode live or on the day of broadcast.

Production

Casting

The third season introduced two new series regulars, both of whom were credited as starring in select episodes. Katie Cassidy portrayed the demon Ruby, who was created to change the perception of demons into more of a grey area, rather than the "black and white", "They're evil, we're good" approach previously used in the series. Likewise, Lauren Cohan's character of Bela Talbot was meant to be "someone [the Winchesters have] really never come across before". Self-serving, she steals mystical artifacts for profit and has no interest in the "altruistic or obsessed or revenge-minded motives of hunting". In response to fan concerns about the characters, series creator Eric Kripke stated, "[Ruby and Bela are] there for important plot elements, but it's not the Ruby and Bela show, nor is it about the four of them cruising around in the Impala together. It's about the guys." Budgetary reasons brought about the replacement of Cassidy for the fourth season, while the character of Bela was removed due to the negative fan reaction.

While there were new faces for the third season, much of the cast carried over from the previous year. Actor Jim Beaver returned as hunter Bobby Singer, and felt the character had grown into a surrogate father for Sam and Dean over time. Richard Speight Jr. returned as the Trickster in "Mystery Spot", as did Travis Wester and A. J. Buckley in "Ghostfacers" as Harry Spangler and Ed Zeddmore. Portraying "bumbling versions" of the Winchesters, Wester and Buckley improvised many of their lines. The writers also considered bringing back Charles Malik Whitfield for a recurring role, with his character, FBI Agent Victor Henriksen, continues his hunt for the brothers throughout the season. Whitfield stated his willingness to relocate to Vancouver, but the writers ultimately went a different direction. Because the threat of being captured by Henriksen looms over the Winchesters all season, the writers wanted to bring the plotline to a close in "Jus in Bello". Kripke suggested that Gamble develop and deepen his character, "give him a great send off, and then kill him...or at least...mostly kill him". With the character last seen being confronted by the demon Lilith, Gamble noted that Agent Henriksen's fate was left ambiguous, and that she herself was uncertain.

Appearances of other characters did not work out as originally planned. Sterling K. Brown made his final appearance as the vampire hunter Gordon Walker in "Fresh Blood" after a brief role in "Bad Day at Black Rock". The character's story arc for the season was intended to be longer, but Brown's commitments to the Lifetime Television series Army Wives limited his return to only two episodes. Filming for the movie Watchmen prevented Jeffrey Dean Morgan from returning in a dream sequence as John Winchester in "Dream a Little Dream of Me", but the actor was able to provide his voice for the episode "Long Distance Call". The 2007–08 Writers Guild of America strike forced the writers to scrap an episode featuring the return of Samantha Ferris as Ellen Harvelle in the middle of the season, and failed negotiations prevented an appearance in the finale.

Some casting choices were influenced by affiliations with the actors and crew. Sandra McCoy, who played a host to the Crossroads Demon in "Bedtimes Stories", began dating Padalecki after working with him on the 2005 film Cry Wolf. Before her appearance on the series she had auditioned for the roles of Jessica Moore, Sam's girlfriend in the pilot episode; Sarah, a love interest for Sam in the first-season episode "Provenance"; and Carmen, Dean's girlfriend in the second-season alternate-reality episode "What Is and What Should Never Be". She believed that, due to her relationship with Padalecki, the production staff were waiting until the "perfect role" arrived before casting her. The role of the immortal Doc Benton was reserved for actor Billy Drago, whom executive producer Kim Manners had previously worked with on the television series The Adventures of Brisco County, Jr.. A fan of Frankenstein-actor Boris Karloff, Drago said of the role, "This was an opportunity to play both Dr. Frankenstein and his creation simultaneously. Instead of creating some immortal monster, he makes himself immortal. This was my chance to pay homage to what I consider one of the great actors of our time". Due to the time required to apply the extensive make-up and prosthetics for the role, Drago ended up with a minimum of 20-hour work days. However, he felt that the sleep deprivation improved his performance because "Benton's immortal and [moving] all the time". Manners also selected his assistant, Kelley Cleaver, to play one of Doc Benton's victims.

Writing

For the third season, Kripke and the writing staff tried to mix the style of the "simple, pure, emotional" first season mythology with the "intensity" of the second season's self-enclosed episodes. Kripke noted that Dean's demonic deal of the previous season provided the writers with "a lot of effective emotional context to play with". The writing for Sam focused on the character growing up in order to support Dean, making the character more independent as he begins to realize that Dean will not be around forever; Dean, however, acts immaturely to hide his fear of going to Hell, and eventually learns for himself that he is worth saving. Kripke described the season's storylines, including the self-enclosed episodes, as "very cross-cultural". He commented, "We borrow from every world religion, every culture. The cosmology of the show is that if a legend exists about something somewhere out there in the world, it's true. So you really have this cross-pollination of different demons, different creatures, all from different religions."

With the demon Azazel—the main antagonist of the first two seasons—dying in the second-season finale, demons as a whole became the primary villains of the third season. This excited the writers because the mythology became "just about all of these different demons and all the different things demons do". The revelation that demons are in actuality the corrupted souls of humans was instituted for two reasons: it not only "opened up the mythology in an interesting and complicated way" by implying that demons are "not just black and white" and that "dark evil can exist in the human heart under the right conditions", but it also served as character development for Dean by showing him what he will one day become in Hell.

A reflection of terrorist cells, the demonic war against humanity is mainly depicted in the third season through small groups of demons working independently. On this aspect, Kripke commented, "They were not necessarily organized, and there was a danger in that, that they could be everywhere. Each one has a different motive." The studio voiced its belief that the series was "suffocating" because it had "just these two guys and these creepy little rooms", and suggested that the writers "open up the scope of the story and make things more epic" following the "epic kind of scope" associated with the second-season episodes "Hollywood Babylon" and "All Hell Breaks Loose". With this in mind, the writers decided to depict the war as large-scale. Though Kripke warned that doing so would cost much more money, the studio gave its blessing to exceed the allotted budget. However, the season premiere came in "way, way over budget", prompting the studio to change its mind. Kripke noted that this had ramifications for the season, and commented, "All season we've been promising this demon war, but due to the fact that we don't have $20 million an episode, we really have to pick and choose when we're going to show the battles of that war."

As time passed, Kripke felt that the terrorist-cell format was not working out as planned, partly because he prefers writing based on old legends rather than current topics. In his opinion, the season did not hit its stride until the seventh episode because the first six were bogged down by budget problems and an ambiguous mythology. To stabilize the demon storyline, the writers introduced a new lead villain, with Kripke finding it "refreshing to get back on firm ground where you knew there was a bad guy and you knew there was a plan". They were uncertain for a while as to who the new demon leader would be, and gave the character the working title of Zarqawi during the planning stages. Gamble insisted that the demon be female, and suggested that she be the mythological Lilith. The debate then shifted to whether Lilith should be a woman or little girl, with the writers eventually settling on the latter because they found it creepier.

Only 12 episodes were made before production was sidelined by the 2007–08 Writers Guild of America strike. Regarding the final four episodes before the hiatus, Kripke noted, "We were just getting to a point in our storyline when we were really starting to ramp up the mythology and really ramp up both the pace and the size, the story events that happened, both in terms of the mythology and in terms of the lives of the characters. We started rolling with that, and you'll see the increased momentum and increased intensity in these four episodes." Because the possibility existed that production would not resume until the fourth season, the writers reordered the final two episodes; "Jus in Bello", which reintroduced the demon war under Lilith's command and had an "epic sweep to it", became the final episode instead of "Mystery Spot" to establish a "jerry-rigged season climax".

When the strike ceased, only four more episodes were produced. This forced the postponement of many planned expansions of the series mythology, such as Mary Winchester's connection to Azazel and the escalating demon war. A major deviation occurred with the development of Sam's demonic abilities. The writers intended for him to save Dean from Hell, possibly even before the season finale, by giving into his demonic powers and becoming "this fully operational dark force" who would then want to go after Lilith. However, the strike prevented the writers from fleshing out his evolving abilities, and the story arc was pushed back into the fourth season. Despite this, Kripke felt the strike's effects ended up making the series "meaner, leaner, and more concise", as they were able to focus the remaining episodes onto "the storyline [they] needed to pay off"—Dean's demonic pact. He also pointed out that the strike gave the writers and actors a much-needed break, reenergizing them for the final episodes and subsequent season.

Many episodes featured independent stories, which attain closure at the end of each episode and add little to the overarching storylines. Certain aspects of these were inspired by real-life events. According to Gamble, the birth of Kripke's child caused the writing staff to start "thinking about how creepy babies are". This led to the decision to base an episode around changelings—infant creatures who are exchanged with human babies. The writers chose the deviate from folklore, making the changelings older in "The Kids Are Alright" to avoid having Sam and Dean blowtorching babies. The title of the episode "Malleus Maleficarum" references the Middle Ages treatise of the same name detailing how to deal with witches; this decision stemmed from the intended plot of the episode, which involved a small town initiating a witch hunt. In the end, a demon would have been revealed to be framing the women in order to create chaos. However, the writers felt the story was too similar to "Sin City", and instead had the demon Tammi turn a group of women into witches. The episode's sequence in which a character finds maggots in his hamburger was inspired by Kripke's "horrific" discovery of a maggot-covered possum in his garbage can.

Other stories were developed from simple concepts. Writer Ben Edlund desired to write a "screwball comedy" that did not feature any monsters. Kripke was "enamored" with the idea, and it evolved into the rabbit's foot episode "Bad Day at Black Rock". The concept of the curse box—a container for the rabbit's foot that "magically [cuts] off the cursed items from the rest of the continuum"—was based on Pandora's Box. The episode "Sin City" was originally only meant to be written by Jeremy Carver, who pitched a concept similar to the film Enemy Mine—Dean would be trapped with a demon in a wine cellar. However, he realized that the second half would mainly feature a conversation between Dean and the demon and would deeply delve into demon mythology. Carver sought help, and Robert Singer agreed to write the scenes for him. Singer enjoyed humanizing demons and presenting their point of view. For "Mystery Spot", the story development fell into place during the writing process. It started off as a Groundhog Day-concept—the same day repeating for a character—which was then expanded into repeatedly killing Dean. The decision to make it into another Trickster episode brought it all together.

Filming
Principal photography took place in Vancouver, British Columbia. Because the series uses few standing sets, set designer Jerry Wanek often constructed entirely new sets for each episode. He often followed specific themes, especially with the Winchesters' lodging. For example, the Spanish-looking motel room of "Malleus Maleficarum" was inspired by the Procol Harum song "Conquistador". Because the town of "Sin City" was intended to be a New Orleans/Las Vegas hybrid, the episode's motel-room theme was "a little more flamboyant" with a color scheme of "old Las Vegas". At times, however, Wanek was able to reuse old sets, such as with the refurbishment of "The Magnificent Seven"s bar for "Sin City".

Not all scenes could take place in the studio, and some were instead shot on location. Parts of "Sin City" were shot in Langley, British Columbia; production was only given control over part of the main street, so traffic was driving by during filming. Both "Red Sky at Morning" and "Bedtime Stories" used Burnaby's Heritage Park; it functioned as a cemetery for the former, while the latter used it as the site of a giant gingerbread house. It took three days to build the house along a gravel-road trail, and the greens department added in foliage. The house was designed to be more of a cottage to avoid appearing too surreal. Unfortunately for McCoy, the crossroads scenes of "Bedtime Stories" were filmed at night in the freezing cold. The actress' wardrobe consisted only of an "almost nonexistent" dress, which made her "miserable". Though she found the experience to be "a lot of fun", McCoy had a serious case of stage fright working with Padalecki. She was too emotional to run her scenes beforehand with him, and even at one point during filming had to excuse herself to craft service to "eat and cry like the emotional girl [she] was that night".

Some aspects of the storylines were conceived on set during filming. Lisa's kiss with Dean at the end of "The Kids Are Alright" was unscripted; director Phil Sgriccia convinced actress Cindy Sampson to do so because he wanted to see how Ackles would react. Sgriccia also added in similarities between Dean and his possible son Ben, such as having them both look down at same moment after being scolded, and both checking out the "hot mom and the hot little girl" in unison. This was to make them appear to be, as Kripke noted, of "similar mind and body".

To the production staff's chagrin, the network requested a "more colorful look" for the third season. Director of photography Serge Ladouceur commented, "I went along with it and made it work. The dark scenes were still shot dark, so we were cautious in keeping the direction of our show." While the new lighting became normal for the season, other methods atypical to the series were also used. The knife-fight sequence that introduces Ruby in "The Magnificent Seven" was shot at 120 frames per second. This high rate allowed for the scene to be sped up or slowed down during post-production. Filming for the reality-show themed episode "Ghostfacers" featured no crews on the set; the actors instead carried their own cameras and lighting. Padalecki found it "pretty liberating" because he did not have to worry about finding his marks or making sure not to block people from the camera.

Wardrobe
Costumes for the season were designed by Diane Widas. For the character of Ruby, Widas used dark tones to better hide her in shadows. Her wardrobe consisted of pleather jackets and narrow jeans to allow the actress to be more active. Child actor Nicholas Elia, who portrayed Dean's potential son in "The Kids Are Alright", was meant to look like a "Little Dean". Widas intended to make a smaller version of the canvas three-quarter jacket that Dean wears, but she ended up finding another jacket that was ultimately used. Other wardrobe designs were influenced by episode themes, with the villains of "A Very Supernatural Christmas" wearing "very campy" Christmas sweaters. For the costumes of "Sin City", Widas noted that "passion colors—purples and oranges and reds—were brought into the mix to create that 'anything goes' feeling". For "Bad Day at Black Rock", production designer John Marcynuk included a rabbit in every scene that involved an act of good luck, such as a Vietnam veteran wearing an embroidered rabbit patch.

Effects
To depict the supernatural aspects of the show, the series makes use of visual, special, and make-up effects, as well as stuntwork. Visual effects is an in-house department, and is supervised by Ivan Hayden. The opening scene of "The Magnificent Seven" featured the most demons clouds of the first three seasons; Hayden noted that the army cloud consisted of hundreds of individual demons. The episode "Mystery Spot" heavily relied on visual effects for Dean's various death sequences by making use of a computer-generated 3D model of Ackles. Because of the episode's light tone, they were not afraid to make the effects silly, such as by showing Dean's skeleton when he is electrocuted.

For the changelings in "The Kids Are Alright", Kripke merely instructed Hayden to make the children's faces pale and have dark circles beneath their eyes. Hayden, however, felt they could do more, and modeled the appearance after a lamprey. They also attempted to base the design in reality by applying real-world evolution. With a flat face, they reasoned that its nose would have retracted and its eyes would have receded for protection, eventually shriveling up and disappearing over time.

Though the script for "Red Sky at Morning" described the confrontation between the ghostly sailors as "they collide into a swirling vortex that disappears", Kripke and Singer ultimately left creative control up to Hayden. Production filmed each element of the sequence separately, with the cemetery itself taking place at Heritage Park. A separate plate used exploding water balloons shot at 1,000 frames per second; this high frame rate allowed for the use of slow motion. The layers were then composited into a single sequence, with the elements transitioning into 3D models of the characters and water after the initial collision.

Special effects were also a major aspect of production. For example, hydraulics were used in "The Magnificent Seven" to break the devil's trap on the ceiling, and required two takes to film. When the ceiling did not fully crack the first time, it took 45 minutes to take out the ceiling and replace the hydraulics. The same episode also depicts a car crashing into a bar. The department cabled the car to a large decelerator—a "big shock absorber"—so that they could drive the car fast but not worry about hitting the cameraman. Costs, however, sometimes hindered the use of effects, such as in "Red Sky at Morning". The spirit's first victim would have drowned after her shower fills with water, and a later scene would have depicted a similar death in a car. When production determined that they could not afford these set pieces, the writers reduced the ghost's ability to merely drowning his victims through touch. The spirit attacks Bela in the episode's climax, which made use of a contraption built by special effects makeup artist Tony Lindala; a tube connected to a denture on the off-camera side of Cohan pumped out large amounts of water, creating the illusion that she is vomiting it out.

Music
The mostly synthesized orchestral score of the season was composed by Christopher Lennertz and Jay Gruska. The pair try to base the music on the visuals of each episode, with about a third of each episode's score being newly written for the supernatural legend. For example, Lennertz penned distinct music for each Sin in "The Magnificent Seven", with a "slow, lumbering, creepy low-end thing" theme for Sloth. As part of Ruby's introduction in the same episode, he scraped a quarter against a cymbal to create a scraping metal sound that was "a little otherworldly". Lennertz feels that "people associate the sound of violins with vampires" due to the "connection with Eastern Europe and counts", and used a "very violin-heavy" score for "Fresh Blood".

Unusual for the series, co-executive producer Ben Edlund contributed to the music of "Ghostfacers". The writer of the episode, Edlund penned the reality show's theme song before he even pitched the concept to Kripke. Lennertz and Edlund sang the theme song and played guitars, intending to make it the "silliest theme song [they] could come up with". The score was treated like it was a reality show, so Lennertz used "really cheesy synthesizers" to mimic reality show music, and made it "sound lame on purpose".

In addition to the score, the series makes use of rock songs, with most being selected from Kripke's private collection. Rock songs are also usually featured in "The Road So Far" montages at the beginning of select episodes that recap previous events. The premiere used AC/DC's "Hells Bells", while the finale recapped the entire season to Kansas' "Carry On Wayward Son".

Reception
Supernatural did well with viewers aged 18–49. In this category, it ranked eighth of all returning series broadcast by a major network. Overall it ranked No. 187 relative to the position of other prime time network shows. Despite its average viewership of 2.74 million Americans, the show received an early pickup for its fourth season.

Critical reception to the season has generally been mixed. The review aggregator website Rotten Tomatoes reported an approval rating of 88% with an average score of 6.09/10, based on 8 reviews. 

Tim Janson of Mania felt the season moved "at a breakneck pace", describing the viewing experience as "being on a trail speeding headlong into the unknown". Giving the season a grade of an "A", he praised the writers for avoiding becoming "one-dimensional" even after introducing so many demonic villains, and also added that they "did a good job" in including self-enclosed episodes despite the writers' strike. Diana Steenbergen of IGN somewhat disagreed, and gave the season a score of 8.4 out of 10. Although she generally enjoys season-long story arcs, Steenbergen felt that Dean's time limit signified to viewers that the plotline would not be resolved until the season finale. With this mindset, the middle episodes "feel like they are treading water". She found the season premiere to be "pretty boring", but called "Jus in Bello" to be "one of the best episodes of the year, maybe even of the show itself", because it begins with an "epic battle" setting but still "focuses on the personal level of the Winchesters and the people around them". Also praised was the character growth for the brothers, such as Sam's exploration of his darker side. Because Dean is usually portrayed as having a "tough, bravado filled exterior", she liked to see Ackles "go deeper" during his character's many "earnest conversations" with Sam. The "likeable secondary characters" of Charles Malik Whitfield's Agent Henrickson and Jim Beaver's Bobby Singer were welcomed back. While there were "a number of good episodes", Maureen Ryan of the Chicago Tribune pointed out the "few outright clunkers" such as "Red Sky at Morning". With a lack of a "compelling unifying concept or theme"—Ryan found demons to always be a threat and felt that Dean's deal didn't carry the "same weight" as later arcs did—she posited that the third season "wasn't the show's finest hour". Combining the effects of the strike with The CW's attempts to interfere, she deemed the season "rockier than Seasons 2 or 4". Airlock Alphas Julie Pyle criticized the season's brighter lighting, calling it "Supernatural Lite". Fans, too, had mixed feelings for the season. Common complaints, in comparison to the first two seasons, included a reduction in rock music, "intensity", and "snappy dialogue".

Regarding the introduction of Ruby and Bela, critics generally had negative views. Steenbergen had hoped that more female characters "would make things interesting", but ultimately found them to be "wasted characters" that were "unlikable and manipulative" and "usually made our heroes look stupid". While Pyle deemed Cohan a "quite talented" actress, she noted that the character "feels forced into each episode". By the middle of the season, fan reaction to Bela and Ruby also tended to be negative. Many described them as "badly written and badly acted" characters that detract from the Winchesters' brotherly relationship, though some did deem the women "interesting".

Work on the episode "Jus in Bello" garnered the sound editors an Emmy Award nomination in the category of "Outstanding Sound Editing For A Series", while "Ghostfacers" received a GLAAD Media Award nomination in the category of "Outstanding Individual Episode (in a series without a regular LGBT character)".

Home media release
The third season was released as a five-disc Region 1 DVD box set in the US on September 2, 2008, a month before the premiere of the fourth season. Including all 16 episodes of the third season, the set also featured DVD extras such as bloopers, episode discussions by the writers, a featurette on the various effects used on the show, and a digital copy of the season. The set was ranked No. 6 in DVD sales for its week of release, selling 104,979 units for $4,093,131. It slipped to No. 18 the following week with 35,593 units for $1,387,771. Though sales increased in the third week—40,034 units for $1,560,926—the set fell to No. 19, and was bumped off the top-30 list by the fourth week. The season was also released in Region 2 on August 25, 2008, and in Region 4 on September 30, 2008. A three-disc, region-free Blu-ray box set was later released on November 11, 2008.

Notes

References

Footnotes

Bibliography

External links

 
 
 

Supernatural 03
2007 American television seasons
2008 American television seasons